Riverside Drive is a northeast–southwest road connecting the San Fernando Valley and Downtown Los Angeles, California. It follows the course of the Los Angeles River.

Overview
It runs through the heart of the Valley and is home to many of Southern California's major entertainment companies, passing both the Warner Bros. and Walt Disney Studios in Burbank. Then it enters West Glendale and continues as a major thoroughfare until it intersects with Victory Boulevard and Sonora Avenue. It then continues as the major thoroughfare through Griffith Park, though its name changes as it passes through the park, first to Zoo Drive, then Crystal Springs Drive, and then Griffith Park Drive, before becoming Riverside Drive again as it leaves the park at its southeastern boundary. Riverside Drive then continues east and south along the Los Angeles River, passing just north of the Silver Lake Reservoir. It runs along the northern edge of Elysian Park, passing north of Dodger Stadium before becoming Figueroa Street at a roundabout with San Fernando Road just north of the confluence of Arroyo Seco and the Los Angeles River.

Local transportation
Metro Local lines 96 and 155 operate on Riverside Drive.

Cities and communities
Listed west to east, or north to south
 Sherman Oaks
 Studio City
 Valley Village
 Toluca Lake
 Burbank
 Glendale
 Silver Lake
 Los Feliz
 Elysian Park

Notable places
Listed west to east, or north to south

 Los Angeles River
 Westfield Fashion Square, Sherman Oaks, California
 Notre Dame High School, Sherman Oaks, California
 North Hollywood Medical Center, North Hollywood, California, a former hospital used for the filming of the Scrubs TV series for its first eight seasons
 Oldest remaining Bob's Big Boy Restaurant
 Providence High School, Burbank, California
 Forest Lawn Memorial Park (nearby)
 Disney Channel Headquarters, Burbank, California
 Warner Bros. Studios, Burbank, California
 Warner Records, Burbank, California
 Walt Disney Studios, Burbank, California
 ABC Studios, Burbank, California
 Walt Disney Animation Studios, Burbank, California
 Equidome
 Los Angeles Equestrian Center
 Los Angeles Zoo (Zoo Drive)
 Autry National Center (Zoo Drive)
 Griffith Park (Griffith Park Drive)
 Griffith Observatory (nearby)
 Silver Lake Reservoir (nearby)
 Elysian Park, Los Angeles, California
 Dodger Stadium (nearby)

Gallery

Sport
The drive hosted part of the 50 km walk athletic event near Griffith Park for the 1932 Summer Olympics.

References

Streets in Los Angeles
Streets in Los Angeles County, California
Streets in the San Fernando Valley
Transportation in Glendale, California
Burbank, California
Elysian Park, Los Angeles
Los Feliz, Los Angeles
Sherman Oaks, Los Angeles
Silver Lake, Los Angeles
Studio City, Los Angeles
Toluca Lake, Los Angeles
Venues of the 1932 Summer Olympics
Olympic athletics venues